Johan Frederik Karel Hendrik Jacob Burk (born 11 May 1887 in Amsterdam – ?) was a Dutch rower who competed in the 1908 Summer Olympics.

After a four months training period, he competed in the 1908 Summer Olympics in the coxless four event. He and the other of the team were a member of “de Amstel” and were trained by J. J. K. Ooms. The team won the bronze medal in the coxless four. In 1914 he moved to Natal, South Africa, but shortly after emigrated to the United States. He served in the US army during World War I and later worked as a clerk and bookkeeper in Brooklyn, New York.

References

External links
profile
Profile at Sports Reference

1887 births
Year of death missing
Dutch male rowers
Olympic rowers of the Netherlands
Rowers at the 1908 Summer Olympics
Olympic bronze medalists for the Netherlands
Rowers from Amsterdam
Olympic medalists in rowing
Dutch emigrants to the United States
Medalists at the 1908 Summer Olympics
20th-century deaths
United States Army personnel of World War I